Martin Thomas is an English retired professional footballer who played as a midfielder for numerous teams in the Football League. During his spell at Swansea he is remembered for scoring the goal which knocked West Ham out of the FA Cup third round in January 1999.

References

External links

1973 births
Living people
English footballers
Association football midfielders
Southampton F.C. players
Leyton Orient F.C. players
Fulham F.C. players
Swansea City A.F.C. players
Brighton & Hove Albion F.C. players
Oxford United F.C. players
Exeter City F.C. players
Eastleigh F.C. players
Winchester City F.C. players
English Football League players